The Monte Rosa is a hotel, located in the main street of Zermatt. It was frequented by the members of the Alpine Club, including Edward Whymper who made the first ascent of the Matterhorn in 1865. The hotel is named after the highest mountain near Zermatt, Monte Rosa.

External links 

 

Hotels in Switzerland
Zermatt
Buildings and structures in Valais
Hotel buildings completed in 1855
19th-century architecture in Switzerland